Jess Lee Kar Wei (Pha̍k-fa-sṳ: Lí Kâi-vì, born June 1, 1988 in Seremban, Negeri Sembilan, Malaysia), is a Chinese Malaysian singer.

She was the finalist and grand winner of the popular televised singing competition One Million Star (7th Season) in Taiwan, and is the first Malaysian to win in the competition, breaking the record of scoring the highest mark (30) four times consecutively in the final round. She currently resides in Taiwan and has attended the National Taiwan University as an exchange student. In September 2011, Lee's first album, Thank You My Love, was debuted under the label Warner Music Taiwan.

She is a contestant on the second season of AHTV's Mad for Music, as a part of their Hurricane Team.

In 2015, she appeared in the 3rd season of I Am a Singer on China's Hunan Television.

Discography 
Thank You My Love (2011, Warner Music Taiwan)
Heaven/Cliff (2014, Warner Music Taiwan)
Love Storm (2016)
About Jess (2018)

References

External links
 Jess Lee Official Facebook Page

1988 births
Living people
21st-century Malaysian women singers
People from Negeri Sembilan
Malaysian people of Hakka descent
People from Meixian District
One Million Star contestants
Hakka musicians
Malaysian Mandopop singers
Warner Music Group artists
Malaysian expatriates in Taiwan